Darwin for Beginners, republished as Introducing Darwin, is a 1982 graphic study guide to Charles Darwin and Evolution written by Dr. Jonathan Miller and illustrated by Borin Van Loon. The volume, according to the publisher's website, "unravels Darwin’s life and his contribution to biology, and traces the path from his scientific predecessors to the later modifications that his own evolutionary theories required."

Publication history
This volume was originally published in the UK by Writers and Readers Publishing Cooperative in 1982, following the collapse of this organisation in 1984, in part due to a disagreement over the selling off of the US rights to this title, the book has subsequently been republished in the US by Pantheon Books and in the UK by Icon Books.

Work on the book proved difficult at times, according to illustrator Borin Van Loon, as the schedule of the author Jonathan Miller was, "always taken up with lighting Rigoletto at the Royal Opera House or making a television series on the human body.

Selected editions:

Related volumes in the For Beginners... series:

Related volumes in the Introducing... series:

Reception
Professor David B. Richman, writing in Reports of the National Center for Science Education, described the book as, "a rather charming graphic account of Darwin's ideas."  Professor Richard C. Lewontin, writing in New York Review of Books, describes the book as, "a superb introduction to a very tricky subject." Los Angeles Times reviewer Charles Solomon, however, dismisses it as, "a competent but by no means extraordinary biography."

Professor Jon Seger, writing in New Scientist, describes the style of author Jonathan Miller, who he point out is primarily known as a TV physician, as, "that of a television documentary." While Miller's text is, according to Lewontin, "historically correct, scientifically impeccable," with, "all the emphasis in the right place."

Van Loon's illustrations are,  according to Lewontin, "a constant reminder not to take the life of the mind more seriously than it deserves." Seger describes, "the stream of rapidly changing images," as, "full of action," although at times, "pointlessly vulgar."

Miller and Van Loon have, concludes Seger, "not produced a work of scholarship," but have, "brought to life an important chapter of scientific history."

References

Non-fiction graphic novels
Biographical comics
Comics based on real people
Books about Charles Darwin
Popular science books
Educational comics
Books about evolution
1982 in comics
Cultural depictions of Charles Darwin
Comics set in the 19th century